Catherine Filloux is an American playwright. Filloux's plays have confronted the issue of human rights in many nations. She is of French and Algeria descent. She lives in New York City, New York.

Biography 
Catherine Filloux's mother is from Oran, Algeria and her father from Guéret, France. Of her parents, Filloux says, "My dad was born in the center of France, and he became an adventurer," who sailed from France to New York in a catamaran. "My mom was a very literate person who loved literature" and wrote poetry in both French and English. As a child, Filloux moved with her family to San Diego, where she grew up. She says, "We grew up... in this kind of schism of Algeria, France, and San Diego. So it made for a background of not really knowing where one belongs..."

Filloux received her MFA in dramatic writing from Tisch School of the Arts at New York University (NYU) and her French baccalaureate with honors in Toulon, France.

Career 
Filloux's plays have confronted the issue of human rights in many nations. She was first drawn to the subject upon reading of the psychosomatic blindness suffered by a group of Cambodian women after witnessing the massacres of the Khmer Rouge, a story that formed the basis of her 2004 play Eyes of the Heart. She worked with survivors of the Cambodian genocide, developing the oral history project A Circle of Grace with the Cambodian Women's Group at St. Rita's Centre for Immigration and Refugee Services in the Bronx, New York.

Her 2005 play Lemkin's House is based on the life of Raphael Lemkin, the Polish Jew and American immigrant lawyer who invented the word genocide in 1944 and spent his life striving to have it recognized as an international crime.

In her 2010 play, Dog and Wolf, a U.S. asylum lawyer seeks to win asylum for Jasmina, a Bosnian refugee. Filloux says of her play, "[It] is written in the staggered poetry of the effort to connect and articulate," grappling with themes of identity, law, sexuality, and family.

Filloux states "For a while, these crimes were the 'best-kept secrets,' but they're not even secrets. They happen all the time, and nobody cares. And that's the problem on some level with doing this kind of theater. There's just a little wall that's been built up against these things, and to write theater about them is part of the challenge."

Throughout her career, Filloux has constantly sought new ways to tell stories and engage audiences such as with opera. In 2022, Filloux participated in a talk with Keturah Stickann as part of Words First: Talking Text in Opera. During the conversation, titled “Catherine Filloux and Writing Social Justice,” Filloux discussed the artistic process, particularly in the realm of opera and her work on the libretto of Orlando with Olga Neuwirth, describing the "sublime" aspect of seeing the music of an opera carry the words of a text.

In a 2008 interview in The Brooklyn Rail, Filloux stated: "For twenty years I have written about Cambodia, P.T.S.D., genocide and trauma. People have exposed their pain to me. I have tried to understand how such violence can occur, how people can so bravely survive, and I felt the raw need to be honest about myself. ... To hold two opposing things in your hands at the same time and to balance them: I'm in that passage, trying to be Here and There. Last time I went to Cambodia, I felt for the first time I could be in two places at the same time, and not compare. That came from writing this play Killing the Boss."

Works

Plays (selected productions) 
Under the Skin
2021 Based on the writing of Claudia Bernardi; Created for and developed with Mercedes Herrero; Commissioned by INTAR; Virtual Workshop, Lou Moreno, Artistic Director, and Paul Slee Rodriguez, Executive Director, New York, NY
White Savior
2020 Pygmalion Productions, Rose Wagner Performing Arts Center, Salt Lake City, UT
turning your body into a compass
2019 A Live Stream Web Story, Culture Hub and Chaotic Sequence Productions; Directed by Daria Sommers; Produced by Daria Sommers and Arthur Vincie; Theatre Director DeMone Seraphin; Livestreaming and video production by CultureHub, New York, NY
whatdoesfreemean
2018 Premiere, Nora's Playhouse, (New York, NY)
2016 Readings at John Jay College of Criminal Justice, and College and Community Fellowship, (New York, NY)
Kidnap Road
2017 Premiere at La MaMa, 55th Season, (New York, NY)
2016 Presented by Anna Deavere Smith, NYU's Institute on the Arts and Civic Dialogue, (New York, NY)
2015 Presented by Joan B. Kroc Institute for Peace and Justice (IPJ) & School of Peace Studies, University of San Diego, The Art of Peace symposium
2015 Headline for Planet Connections Staged Reading Series, Paradise Factory, New York, NY
Selma '65
2014-2015 premiere at La Mama 53rd season, (commissioned by Marietta Hedges), New York, NY; US tour to venues around the US
Mock Court (Play Commission)
2014 Book Wings Iraq, a collaborative bilingual theatre initiative produced in partnership with The University of Iowa's International Writing Program and the Bureau of Educational and Cultural Affairs at the U.S. Department of State.  Iowa City, Iowa, and Baghdad, Iraq.
Luz
2012 La MaMa, 51st Season, New York, New York
Dog and Wolf
2010 59E59 Theaters, New York, New York
(Developed at The Playwrights' Center, Minneapolis, Minnesota& New York Theatre Workshop, New York, New York)
2010 Dog and Wolf Community Outreach Project (Watson Arts): Bronx, Brooklyn, Manhattan and Queens, New York
Killing the Boss
2008 Cherry Lane Theatre, New York, New York
Lemkin's House
2007 Season, Rideau de Bruxelles, Brussels, Belgium
2006 McGinn-Cazale Theatre, New York, New York; Producers: Vital Theatre Co. & Body Politic Theater
2006 Season, 78th Street Theatre Lab, New York, New York
2005 Season, Kamerni Teatar 55, Sarajevo, Bosnia; & Roxy Art House, Edinburgh, Scotland
2005 U.S. Holocaust Memorial Museum, Washington, DC, (Reading co-sponsored by Theater J)
The Breach (with Tarell McCraney and Joe Sutton)
2008 Season, Seattle Repertory Theatre, Seattle, Washington
2007 Season, Southern Rep, New Orleans, Louisiana (Premiere/Commission)
The Beauty Inside
2005 Season, New Georges, New York, New York (co-produced with InterAct Theatre Co., Philadelphia, Pennsylvania)
Eyes of the Heart
2004 Season, National Asian American Theatre Company (NAATCO), New York, New York
2002 25th Bay Area Playwrights Festival, San Francisco, California
Escuela del Mundo
2006/2005 Seasons, The Ohio State University Theatre Department, Columbus, Ohio, with the Office of International Affairs; Toured high schools in Ohio (Premiere/Commission)
Silence of God
2002 Season, Contemporary American Theater Festival, Shepherdstown, West Virginia (Premiere/Commission)
Mary and Myra
2002 Season, Todd Mountain Theater Project, Roxbury, New York
2000 Season, Contemporary American Theater Festival, Shepherdstown, West Virginia
(Videorecording of CATF Production in New York Public Library for Performing Arts, Lincoln Center)
Arthur's War
2002 Theatreworks/USA, New York, New York (commission) (Music by Jenny Giering)
Price of Madness
1996 Season, Emerging Artists Theatre Company, INTAR, New York, New York
All Dressed Up and Nowhere to Go
Ongoing development for musical with composer Jimmy Roberts (I Love You, You're Perfect, Now Change) and John Daggett
2009 Lyman Center for the Performing Arts, Southern Connecticut State University, New Haven, Connecticut
1994 Season, Playwrights Theatre of Baltimore, Baltimore, Maryland
Venus in the Birdbath
1990 Season, Alleyway Theatre, Buffalo, New York
Cut To: The Deal
2002 Season, Theatre XX, Milwaukee, Wisconsin
1988 Season, Brooklyn Playworks, Brooklyn, New York
Three Continents
1998 InterAct Theatre Co., Philadelphia, Pennsylvania (Reading)
1997 New Georges, New York, New York (Reading)
Photos from S-21 (A Short Play)
Produced in the U.S. and around the world, including Cambodia (in Khmer), Singapore, Thailand, India, Denmark, England and France.
BPV, Passion.com, Marriage À Trois, The G Word, Lessons Of My Father, Storks, The Sun Always Rose, The Russian Doll, White Trash, Visiting Hours
These short plays were produced at Play2C Studio Berlin, Germany; HB Playwrights Theatre, New York, New York; Immigrants' Theatre Project/Women Without Borders, New York, New York; New Georges, "Watch This Space:  A New Georges Anthology", HERE, New York, New York; Lincoln Center Theater Directors Lab & Culture Project's "Brothers Karamazov", New York, New York; Women's Project, New York, New York; Yale Cabaret, Yale University, New Haven, Connecticut; University of California, San Diego Theatre Festival, San Diego, California

Opera Libretti (selected productions) 
Orlando
2022 Grawemeyer Award; 2019 Season Premiere, commissioned by the Weiner Staatsoper (Vienna State Opera), Vienna, Austria, Composer Olga Neuwirth (Co-Librettist)
New Arrivals
2012 Season, Houston Grand Opera, Song of Houston: East + West, Houston, Texas, Composer John Glover (Premiere/Commission)
(Librettist)
Where Elephants Weep
2008 Chenla Theater, Phnom Penh, Cambodia and CTN TV Broadcast, Composer Him Sophy (Commissioned by Cambodian Living Arts)
(Librettist)
The Floating Box: A Story in Chinatown
2001 Season, Asia Society, New York, New York, Composer Jason Kao Hwang (Premiere/Commission); New World Records CD Release (Aaron Copland Fund) (Librettist)

Currently in development

Opera Libretti 
2021-20 Thresh's L'Orient, a multidisciplinary production co-created with choreographer Preeti Vasudevan and composer Kamala Sankaram, 2021 Guggenheim Works & Process, Lincoln Center, New York, NY, (Librettist)
2021-20 Mary Shelley, a new chamber opera, music by Gerald Cohen, dramaturg, Cori Ellison, Black Tea Music (Librettist)

Musical (Co-Bookwriter) 
Welcome to the Big Dipper with Composer Jimmy Roberts (I Love You, You're Perfect, Now Change) and Bookwriter/ Additional Lyrics John Daggett (Lemkin's House), based on Filloux's play
2019 Workshop, Redhouse Arts Center, Syracuse, NY, (Artistic Director, Hunter Foster); 2018 NAMT Finalist, New York, NY

Screenplays 
2000 Play Eyes of the Heart: Developed for Lifetime Television
1999 Priscilla's Story: Screenplay treatment, Malvina Douglas Productions, New York, New York
1990 Alter Ego: Based on the novel, Vestments, by Alfred Alcorn
1988 Prodigal Son: Optioned by Justine Bateman, Bateman Co., Los Angeles, California

Selected publications 
WHITE SAVIOR, Lamedman, Debbie, Editor. The Best Women's Monologues, 2021. Smith and Kraus,
Inc, 2021.
whatdoesfreemean, Stewart, Frank, Editor. Tyranny Lessons: International Prose, Poetry,
Essays, and Performance. Manoa, 2020.
-TURNING YOUR BODY INTO A COMPASS, Stewart, Frank, Bhalla, Alok, Di Ming, Editors. Displaced
Lives: Fiction, Poetry, Memoirs, and Plays from Four Continents. Manoa, 2019.
Kidnap Road, Harbison, Lawrence, Editor. The Best Women's Stage Monologues of 2018. Smith
and Kraus, Inc, 2018.
Eyes of the Heart, six selected plays by Catherine Filloux, Stewart, Frank, Editor. Manoa 29:1
(2017.)
Selma '65, Playscripts, Inc., 2016.
The Beauty Inside Lane, Eric and Nina Shengold, Editors. Plays for Three. New York: Vintage
Books, 2015.
Luz, by Catherine Filloux, with an introduction by José Zayas, “Dreaming the Americas Series,” NoPassport
Press, 2014.
Dog and Wolf & Killing the Boss, two plays by Catherine Filloux, with an introduction by Cynthia E.
Cohen (Brandeis University), “Dreaming the Americas Series,” NoPassport Press, 2011.
Dog and Wolf, Stewart, Frank, and Fiona Sze-Lorrain, Editors. On Freedom: Spirit, Art, and State.
Manoa 24:2 (winter 2012.)
THE BREACH by Filloux/McCraney/Sutton, Trauth, Suzanne M., Brenner, Lisa, Editors, Katrina
On Stage, Northwestern University Press, 2011.
SILENCE OF GOD AND OTHER PLAYS BY CATHERINE FILLOUX – Martin, Carol, Series
Editor of “In Performance,” London, New York, Calcutta: Seagull Books, 2009.
Lemkin's House – Playscripts, Inc., 2007.
Eyes of the Heart:
Playscripts, Inc., 2007.
Martin, Carol and Saviana Stanescu, Editors. Global Foreigners: An Anthology of Plays. London, New
York, Calcutta: Seagull Books, 2006.
Stewart, Frank and Barry Lopez, Editors. Maps of Reconciliation: Literature and the Ethical
Imagination. Manoa, 2007.
Silence of God: Skloot, Robert, Editor. The Theatre of Genocide: Four Plays About Mass Murder
in Rwanda, Bosnia, Cambodia, and Armenia. The University of Wisconsin Press, 2008.
Mary and Myra- Playscripts, Inc., 2005.
ALL DRESSED UP AND NOWHERE TO GO – Playscripts, Inc., 2004.
VENUS IN THE BIRDBATH – Playscripts, Inc., 2004.
PRICE OF MADNESS – Playscripts, Inc., 2003.
Photos from S-21:
Great Short Plays: Volume 4. Playscripts, Inc., 2007.
Lane, Eric and Nina Shengold, Editors. Under Thirty: Plays for a New Generation. New York: Vintage
Books, 2004.
Carden, William, Editor. HB Playwrights Short Play Festival 1998 The Museum Plays. Smith and
Kraus, Inc, 2002.
SEVEN, Dramatists Play Service Inc., 2009 (Filloux et al.)

References

External links 
 Catherine Filloux's website
 Interview with Voices on Genocide Prevention
 Catherine Filloux – Theatre, Memory, and Grappling with Complicity
 BBC World News – Where Elephants Weep
The Catherine Filloux Collection includes play scripts, programs and other accompanying ephemera is held by the Jerome Lawrence and Robert E. Lee Theatre Research Institute, The Ohio State University Libraries.

American people of French descent
Tisch School of the Arts alumni
Living people
21st-century American dramatists and playwrights
Year of birth missing (living people)